The AMF Chevvron is a British two-seat microlight aircraft of the 1980s and 90s. It is a single engined mid-winged monoplane with side-by-side seating. 41 were built.

Design and development
The Chevvron was designed to meet a requirement for an aircraft conforming with the Civil Aviation Authority's regulations for microlight aircraft and fitted with conventional three-axis controls. The Chevvron is a mid-wing monoplane with a pod-and boom configuration and high aspect ratio wings. It is built of composite materials and is fitted with a fixed nosewheel undercarriage.

The first prototype, fitted with a V-tail, made its maiden flight in late 1983. A modified second prototype, with a conventional tail flew in October 1986.

Operational history
AMF Microflight began production of the Chevvron in 1987, with 19 completed at their Membury factory by 1990. A single example was built of the Sea Chevvron, a floatplane version fitted with a more powerful König engine, while examples were also fitted with a  Limbach engine. In total, 41 Chevvrons were built.  In the 1990s, as single-rotor wankel engine from the MidWest AE series was successfully fitted to a Chevvron.

Specifications

References

1980s British sport aircraft
Mid-wing aircraft
Single-engined tractor aircraft
Aircraft first flown in 1983